Life (subtitled Live, and labelled Life:Live on the original vinyl LP editions) is a double live album by Irish rock band Thin Lizzy, released in 1983. This double album was recorded during their farewell tour in 1983, principally at the Hammersmith Odeon in London, UK. Phil Lynott had felt reluctantly that it was time to disband the group after the 1983 tour and to mark the occasion, former Thin Lizzy guitarists Eric Bell (1969–73), Brian Robertson (1974–78) and Gary Moore (1974, 1977 and 1978–79) joined the band on stage at the end of these gigs to do some numbers. This was called "The All-Star Jam".

The versions of "Renegade", "Hollywood" and "Killer on the Loose" featuring Snowy White had been performed two years earlier when he was still with the band. White's participation was only credited to "Renegade".

Lynott described the slower tempo version of "Don't Believe a Word" as being the original arrangement. A version of the song with the slower arrangement appears on Moore's Back on the Streets album from 1978, with Lynott on bass guitar and lead vocals and Brian Downey on drums.

During the performance of "The Rocker", all of the guitarists (except for White) played at the same time (Moore, John Sykes, Scott Gorham, Robertson and Bell), making a total of eight members on stage performing at once (including keyboard player Darren Wharton).

Track listing 
(CD issues combine sides 1 and 2 on CD1 and sides 3 and 4 on CD 2)

Personnel
Phil Lynott – bass guitar, vocals
Scott Gorham – guitar, backing vocals
John Sykes – guitar, backing vocals except "Renegade"
Snowy White - guitar, backing vocals on "Renegade"
Brian Downey – drums, percussion
Darren Wharton – keyboards, backing vocals

Charts

References

1983 live albums
Thin Lizzy live albums
Warner Records live albums
Vertigo Records live albums
Albums recorded at the Hammersmith Apollo